Omobranchus steinitzi is a species of combtooth blenny found in the western Indian ocean, in the Red Sea.  This species reaches a length of  SL.

Etymology 
The species is named after the Israeli marine biologist Heinz Steinitz. (1909-1971), Hebrew University (Jerusalem), for his contributions to marine biology.

References

Endemic fauna of Eritrea
steinitzi
Fish described in 1975
Taxa named by Victor G. Springer
Taxa named by Martin F. Gomon